Griffith Grand Trunk Depot is a historic train station located at Griffith, Lake County, Indiana. It was built in 1911 by the Grand Trunk Western Railroad.  It is a simple one-story, frame building measuring 20 feet by 30 feet. It has a steeply pitched hipped roof with overhanging eaves and a projecting three-sided bay. The depot operated until 1980.  It was moved to its present location in the Griffith Historical Park and Railroad Museum in 1980.

It was listed in the National Register of Historic Places in 2003.

References

External links
Griffith Historical Society website 

History museums in Indiana
Former Grand Trunk Western Railroad stations
Railway stations on the National Register of Historic Places in Indiana
Railway stations in the United States opened in 1911
National Register of Historic Places in Lake County, Indiana
Railway stations in Lake County, Indiana
1911 establishments in Indiana
Former railway stations in Indiana